Epstein–Barr virus positive diffuse large B-cell lymphoma, not otherwise specified (also termed: EBV positive diffuse large B cell lymphoma, NOS; EBV+ DLBCL, NOS; or EBV+ DLBCL) was initially termed in the WHO 2008 classification as Epstein–Barr virus-positive DLBCL of the elderly because it was a specific type of large B-cell lymphoma that appeared to be limited to elderly (e.g. >50 years old) individuals. Since this 2008 WHO classification, however, the disorder has been diagnosed in much younger adults and children.  Accordingly, the WHO classification of 2016 renamed this order as EBV+ DLBCL, NOS. The disease is also classified as one of numerous related and interrelated Epstein-Barr virus-associated lymphoproliferative diseases.

EBV+ DLBCL, NOS is usually CD20 positive, and has clonal immunoglobulin gene rearrangement.


Biology
This type of lymphoma is not associated with immunodeficiency. Although reported almost exclusively in Asians, it is not confined to that population. The disease usually has an extranodal presentation, with or without lymph node involvement.

Morphologically, areas of necrosis are often seen as well as Reed–Sternberg-like cells. There are two subtypes: one with monotonous large cells, the other with numerous cell sizes as well as reactive cells, but different clinical behavior is not appreciated between these subtypes. Morphological differential diagnosis is Hodgkin lymphoma.

Median survival 2 years, 25% 5-year survival.

See also 
 Lymphoma

References

Lymphoma
Epstein–Barr virus–associated diseases